XigmaNAS is network-attached storage (NAS) server software with a dedicated management web interface (written in PHP). It is free software under the terms of the Simplified BSD license.

XigmaNAS is a continuation of the original FreeNAS code, which was developed between 2005 and late 2011. It was released under the name NAS4Free on 22 March 2012. The name was changed to XigmaNAS in July 2018. On SourceForge, it was elected “'Community Choice' Project of the Month” twice, in August 2015 and March 2017.

Technology 
XigmaNAS is an embedded open-source NAS software distribution based on the latest release of FreeBSD. It developed from original FreeNAS 7 code and updated to work with the current latest FreeBSD releases. However, "XigmaNAS preserves FreeNAS’s original m0n0wall/PHP architecture and introduces experimental support for the ARM architecture."

XigmaNAS supports sharing across Windows, Apple, and UNIX-like systems. It includes ZFS v5000, Software RAID (0,1,5), disk encryption, S.M.A.R.T. and email reports etc., with the following protocols: SMB, Samba Active Directory Domain Controller AD, FTP, NFS, TFTP, AFP, rsync, Unison (file synchronizer), iSCSI (initiator and target), HAST, CARP, Bridge, UPnP, and BitTorrent.  All of this is configurable by its web interface.

Features 

All XigmaNAS versions
Multiple architectures: i386 or amd64 and ARM-based versions
Full Web Management Interface (WebGUI)
Hard drive and volume management
Software RAID
Disk encryption (using cryptographic accelerator card if present)
Partition
MBR, GPT
iSCSI initiator
Filesystems
ZFS v5000, UFS
Ext2, Ext3
FAT, NTFS
Networking
802.1q VLAN tagging
Wireless
Network link aggregation
Wake On Lan
Network Bridge
CARP (Common Address Redundancy Protocol)
HAST (Highly Available Storage)
Network Protocols
Server Message Block (SMB, one never used version was known as CIFS) (Samba)
 Active Directory Domain controller (Samba)
Apple Filing Protocol (AFP) (Netatalk)
Network File System (NFS)
FTP (ProFTPD)
TFTP (tftp-hpa)
rsync (client/server)
Unison
SCP (SSH)
iSCSI target
Extra services
UPnP server (FUPPES)
UPnP server (MiniDLNA)
iTunes/DAAP server (Firefly)
Lighttpd (Webserver)
Iperf Iperf3 Network Bandwidth measure
Syncthing File synchronization application
Transmission BitTorrent client
VirtualBox Virtualbox included and managed by phpVirtualBox and noVNC on GUI
Monitoring
S.M.A.R.T. (smartmontools)
Alert by E-mail
SNMP
Syslog
UPS (NUT)

Installation 

XigmaNAS is installable on almost any boot medium including LiveCD optionally with a small USB flash drive for config storage if necessary, both for x86-64 and x86-32 computer platforms up to version 10.3. As of version 11.0, XigmaNAS no longer supports x86-32, but version 10.3 is still getting updates. XigmaNAS can be installed on Compact Flash, USB flash drive, SSD, hard drive or other bootable devices, and supports advanced formatted drives using 4 kB sectors. The software distribution is currently distributed as in ISO image (.iso, ~370 MB) or USB flash drive image (.img, ~320 MB) format, and in source form.

Preferred embedded installation 
A special small footprint embedded image is also available (.img, ~150 MB).
The preferred method is the embedded installation onto a USB stick, Compact Flash card (CF), or HDD/SSD, for which XigmaNAS was designed. The XigmaNAS OS will load into system memory, eliminating system writes to a drive except for configuration changes written to an archive. Flash devices are more energy efficient, and the updating process can be done by WebGUI in the browser, downloading and installing a new firmware image.

History 
The original FreeNAS project derives from m0n0wall.

The FreeNAS 0.7 branch was end-of-life'd in late 2011 after the FreeNAS name was legally acquired by iXsystems, Inc. Starting with version 8.x, new iXsystems developers rewrote FreeNAS and legacy FreeNAS 0.7 was no longer available for download.

The legacy FreeNAS 0.7 code was unable to be developed any longer under the same name, and a name change was necessary. The founder of FreeNAS (Olivier Cochard-Labbé) donated the original FreeNAS source code to the NAS4Free project. With the support of the former developers, namely Daisuke Aoyama and Michael Zoon, it carries on the original FreeNAS code base. FreeNAS 8.x.y and up is a software fork of the original FreeNAS with a new rewritten code-base, continuing the old branded name. In 2018, the project applied for the XigmaNAS trademark in order to protect the brand prior to the release of v11.2.

Awards 
 SourceForge.net — Project of the Month, March 2017

 SourceForge.net — Project of the Month, August 2015

 SourceForge.net — Project of the Week, May 2015

 VMware — "Ultimate Virtual Appliance Challenge, Consumer" (2008)
 SourceForge.net — Project of the Month, January 2007
 InfoWorld — Best of open source in storage (2008)

See also

 OpenMediaVault
 Nexenta
 Openfiler
 FreeNAS
 Zentyal
 List of NAS manufacturers
 Comparison of iSCSI targets
 File area network
 Disk enclosure
 OpenWRT

References

Further reading

External links

 

Free file transfer software
Free software
FreeBSD
Home servers
Network-attached storage
Software using the BSD license